Richard Greer is a former motorcycle speedway rider in the 1970s and 1980s.

Richard played ice hockey for 15 years for a veterans team, in countries such as Czech Republic, Canada, Ireland, Holland and Germany.
Keeping a connection to speedway, he attends Peterborough meetings where he is a Club Promoter for 2021, and is the president of Peterborough Speedway Supporters Club.

Career

Richard Greer, who completed 7 years in Peterborough Panthers colours was a member of the inaugural team of 1970, and is one of only 8 riders that have scored more than 2,000 points for the club in their 51-year history to date.

Richard rode for Peterborough between 1970 & 1973 before moving up to the top sphere of racing with Oxford Rebels, White City Rebels and Birmingham Brummies.  He attained heat leader status with all 3 clubs and was team captain for Peterborough Panthers, White City Rebels and Birmingham Brummies in his time.

His first match with Oxford was on 21 March 1974, where he impressed with 10 points and Oxford beating Ipswich Witches 40-37 in a Knock-Out Cup match. He matched that point performance away to Hull Vikings and another Oxford victory 41-37.Later, in May, with John Dews (speedway rider), he won the Radio Oxford Best Pairs Tournament. In a side affected by injuries, Greer continued to perform, scoring a maximum against Coventry Bees on 27 June.

In 1975, he was part of the Midland Cup winning Oxford Rebels, which saw exciting draws against Swindon Robins home and away, requiring reruns, and an amazing away win against Wolverhampton Wolves to clinch the cup.

Two serious injuries restricted his career however, and he returned to spearhead the Panthers from 1979 to complete another 3 seasons for his home town, before retiring at the end of the 1981 season.

He rode in 234 official matches for Peterborough scoring 2,088 points for an impressive career average of 8.39, scoring 35 paid and full maximums along the way, a figure surpassed by only two other Panthers.

When he retired from racing, Richard became a regular at Peterborough and became Clerk of the Course at Alwalton, later also becoming an FIM official at that level, officiating in that position at several British Grand Prix’s at Cardiff and the World Cup held at Eastbourne.

Personal life

His wife, Joan, died in 2014; they had been married for 46 years. His son, Paul, lives in the West Country and works in computer animation.

References

External links
http://www.worldspeedway.com/artman/publish/article_8664.shtml
http://www.peterboroughspeedway.net/news.php?extend.432

British speedway riders
Peterborough Panthers riders
Oxford Rebels riders
White City Rebels riders
Birmingham Brummies riders
Reading Racers riders
Eastbourne Eagles riders
Living people
1946 births
People from Whittlesey
Sportspeople from Peterborough